Arcticibacter eurypsychrophilus  is a Gram-negative and rod-shaped bacterium from the genus of Arcticibacter which has been isolated from the ice core of the Muji Glacier.

References 

Sphingobacteriia
Bacteria described in 2015